My Favorite War is a 2020 Latvian-Norwegian animated documentary, directed and written by Ilze Burkovska Jacobsen. The fim tells the story of the director's personal experience of growing up in Soviet Latvia from 1970-1990 . The film was co-produced by Ego Media in Latvia and Bivrost Film in Norway. The idea of the making of the film was inspired by Marjane Satrapi's Persepolis and Ari Folman’s Waltz with Bashir. Due to limited budget, the director decided to combine animation with live-action and archival footage and photos. The development of the flim started in 2014, and production began late in 2016. The film won the Contrechamp program at the Annecy Festival in France. The film was released in Latvia in 25 September 2020.

References

Latvian documentary films
Latvian animation
Flash animated films
2020 films
2020 documentary films
Animated documentary films
Animated feature films
2020 animated films